Bernhard Woldenga (4 December 1901 – 19 January 1999) was a German pilot during World War II. He served in the Luftwaffe, commanding the JG 27 and JG 77 fighter wings. Woldenga was a recipient of the Knight's Cross of the Iron Cross of Nazi Germany.

Career
Woldenga's career started as a captain in the merchant marine. He started his flight training in 1928 and worked as chief pilot for the FVK Warnemünde. He transferred to the newly emerging Luftwaffe, taking command as Gruppenkommandeur of the I. Gruppe of Jagdgeschwader 131 (JG 131—131st Fighter Wing) on 15 March 1937. This unit was then renamed on 1 November 1938 to I. Gruppe of Jagdgeschwader 130 (JG 130—130th Fighter Wing) which then became the I. Gruppe of Jagdgeschwader 1 (JG 1—1st Fighter Wing) on 1 May 1939.

With this unit he participated in the invasion of Poland in 1939. He surrender command of the Gruppe on 1 February 1940 and was transferred to the Reichsluftfahrtministerium. He briefly led Jagdgeschwader 27 (JG 27—27th Fighter Wing) on the Channel Front from 11 October to 22 October 1940, replacing Oberst Max Ibel before handing over command to Major Wolfgang Schellmann. He was then made Geschwaderkommodore of Jagdgeschwader 77 (JG 77—77th Fighter Wing) on 2 January 1941. Under this command, JG 77 participated in the Balkans Campaign and invasion of Crete. JG 77 claimed 50 aerial victories.

Awards and recognition 
Woldenga received the Knight's Cross of the Iron Cross. He commanded of JG 27 on 21 June 1941 during the invasion of the Soviet Union and claimed 4 aerial victories. He relocated the Geschwaderstab to North Africa in December 1941. He was appointed Fliegerführer Balkan on 10 June 1942. His last service position of the war was commander of the Luftkriegschule 10 in Fürstenwalde near Berlin. He is credited with three aerial victories of which two were claimed on the Eastern Front.

Awards
 Iron Cross (1939) 2nd and 1st class
 Knight's Cross of the Iron Cross on 5 July 1941 as Major and Geschwaderkommodore of Jagdgeschwader 77

References

Citations

Bibliography

 
 
 
 
 
 

1901 births
1999 deaths
Military personnel from Hamburg
Luftwaffe pilots
German World War II pilots
Recipients of the Knight's Cross of the Iron Cross